Flames is a 1926 American silent drama film directed by Lewis H. Moomaw and starring Eugene O’Brien, Virginia Valli, Jean Hersholt, and Boris Karloff. Its plot follows a railroad laborer who, while working on a bridge in rural Oregon, must face off with a desperado who kidnaps his boss's daughter.

One reel of the feature survives at the Library of Congress, though the remaining five are lost. The film was shot on location in Portland, Oregon, as well as Oregon's Cascade Mountain range in the fall of 1925. Though mostly filmed in black and white, the film's climactic sequence, which features a forest fire, was shot in color.

Plot
Herbert Landis is sent to supervise the construction of a bridge in Oregon by James Travers, a railroad magnate and father of Anne Travers, whom Herbert is secretly in love with. Herbert is dismayed when Anne invites Hilary Fenton, high-society playboy, to accompany them to a rural encampment where the project is headquartered. Anne is attended by Mrs. Edgerton, who acts as a chaperone.

Herbert is dismayed by Anne's interest in Hilary, who is wooing her in an attempt to access her family's fortune. Ole Bergson, Herbert's cabin roommate, devises a plan to help make Anne fall in love with Herbert: Ole disguises himself as Blackie Blanchette, a local desperado, and kidnaps Anne, urging Herbert to "rescue" her from him.

Ole's plan is foiled when he himself is kidnapped by the real Blackie Blackfoot. When a forest fire breaks out in the area, Herbert confronts Blackie, who has brought Anne to a secluded cabin. Blackie is killed when the cabin catches fire, while Herbert and Anne manage to escape the blaze by seeking shelter in a river. The dramatic event leaves Hilary exasperated, finding country life too difficult, and he returns to the city. Upon Hilary's departure, Anne determines Herbert to be the true object of her affection.

Cast

Production
The film was shot in Portland, Oregon in the fall of 1925 under the working title To the Brave, the name of the story by Alfred A. Cohn on which the film is based. It was subsequently retitled How to Train Your Wife before being retitled one final time as Flames, referring to a forest fire sequence that occurs at the climax of the film. The Forest Fire Protective Service oversaw the filming of the dramatic climactic sequence in Oregon's Cascade Range near Odell Lake in central Oregon. Though the majority of the film was shot in black and white, the climactic sequence was filmed in color.

Release
Associated Exhibitors released Flames theatrically on September 15, 1926.

Critical response
A review published in The Pasadena Post noted that the film "was not so outstanding as to attract unusual attention, but the work of its three principal [actors] was." Roscoe McGowen of the New York Daily News wrote that the film was "not a bad picture," though he singled out Hersholt's performance as the standout, noting that he "contributes a Von Stroheim touch of realism."

Availability
Flames is considered a lost film, although one of its six reels is known to survive, and is held by the Library of Congress.

References

Sources

External links

1926 films
1926 drama films
1926 lost films
1920s color films
American black-and-white films
Silent American drama films
American silent feature films
Associated Exhibitors films
Films about wildfires
Films partially in color
Films shot in Oregon
Films shot in Portland, Oregon
Lost American films
Lost drama films
1920s American films